John Parris (born 26 April 1974) is a Barbadian international footballer who plays club football for Notre Dame, as a midfielder.

International

International goals
Scores and results list Barbados' goal tally first.

References

External links

1974 births
Living people
Barbadian footballers
Barbados international footballers
Notre Dame SC players
Association football midfielders